Électricité du Cambodge Football Club (EDCFC; ,) are a football club in Phnom Penh, Cambodia. They will play in the Cambodian Premier League, having won Cambodian League 2

Kit design 
In 2021, the team signed a new kit deal with a Phnom Penh-based sporting apparel company named Forward Sportswear. Their home kit features a signature sky blue colour, whilst their away kit is red.

Season results 
EDCFC have featured in the top flight of Cambodian football since 2018. Their positions in the Cambodian League have varied in recent years. In 2021 they finished 10th after a fairly uneventful season, interrupted by COVID-19 safety measures. In 2020 they finished 12th, in comparison to 11th place in 2019. Their most successful league campaign was in 2018 whereby the team finished 9th during their debut to the top flight of Cambodian football.

Current squad 

(Captain)

(Vice-captain)

References

External links 

Football clubs in Cambodia
Sport in Phnom Penh
Works association football teams